Leontina Vaduva (Romanian: Leontina Văduva; born in Roșiile, on December 1, 1960) is an acclaimed Romanian soprano. She studied at the  Bucharest Conservatory and with Ileana Cotrubaș, and debuted in the title role of Manon at Toulouse, in 1987.  A recipient of the Laurence Olivier Opera Award, she has often appeared at Covent Garden, in Rigoletto (opposite Ingvar Wixell and Jerry Hadley, 1989), Carmen (as Micaëla, 1991 and 1994), and Roméo et Juliette (1994). Leontina Vaduva is the daughter of the Romanian popular music singer Maria Ciobanu.

In 2000, Vaduva appeared at the Metropolitan Opera, in six performances of La bohème (as Mimì, with Luis Lima). The soprano has also sung with the companies of Buenos Aires, Barcelona, Chicago, Cologne, Vienna, and Paris. 

Her discography includes Rigoletto (1993), Les contes d'Hoffmann (as Antonia, with Roberto Alagna, conducted by Kent Nagano, 1994–96), La bohème (again with Alagna, led by Sir Antonio Pappano, 1995), and an album of "Opera Arias," conducted by Plácido Domingo (1997).  Especially noteworthy is her DVD of Roméo et Juliette, with Alagna, conducted by Sir Charles Mackerras and directed by Nicolas Joël (1994).

References 
 The Concise Oxford Dictionary of Opera, Oxford University Press, 1996.

External links 
 Leontina Vaduva in an excerpt from Roméo et Juliette (1994).

1960 births
Living people
Romanian operatic sopranos
Laurence Olivier Award winners
21st-century Romanian women  opera  singers
People from Vâlcea County
20th-century Romanian women opera singers
National University of Music Bucharest alumni
Chevaliers of the Ordre des Arts et des Lettres